Serge Nubret (6 October 193819 April 2011) was a French professional bodybuilder, actor and self published author. He won numerous bodybuilding competitions, including 1976 NABBA Mr. Universe (1976). Nubret was nicknamed "The Black Panther."

Early life
Nubret was born on 6 October 1938 in Anse-Bertrand, Guadeloupe. Nubret has credited Steve Reeves as his childhood inspiration.

Career 
In 1960 Nubret joined the International Federation of Bodybuilders, and was declared World's Most Muscular Man in Montreal. Nubret kept improving, winning titles including NABBA Mr. Universe in 1976 (London), WBBG Pro. Mr. World and Mr. Olympus in 1977 (New York) and another World champion title in 1981 (Geneva). In 1983, 23 years after his first world-class achievement he became the WABBA World Champion in Rome, winning his fifth major title. At 65 years old, Nubret offered a last show to his public during the 2003 World championships in France.

In addition to being recognized by experts, peers, and fans as a reference in the bodybuilding field, Nubret also dedicated himself to the development and promotion of bodybuilding. He became the head of the French and European IFBB bodybuilding federations from 1970 to 1975. In 1975 he founded the World Amateur Body Building Association (WABBA) to host amateur bodybuilding competitions. Serge Nubret would appear in several minor film projects during his career. Nubret was also featured in the 1977 documentary, Pumping Iron, about Arnold Schwarzenegger.

Author
In 2006, the 68-year-old Nubret penned an autobiography Je suis...Moi &Dieu (I am...Me and God) in collaboration with Louis-Xavier Babin-Lachaud. The book which only exists in French tells his life story and his Christian beliefs.

Personal life
Nubret was father to three daughters (Pascale, Karine, and Grace) and a son (Stanley) from two marriages and one relationship. His second marriage was with Jacqueline Nubret, a female bodybuilder with various competition titles.

In March 2009, Nubret fell into a coma, eventually dying on 19 April 2011 of natural causes.

List of bodybuilding awards 

1958:  Mr. Guadeloupe
1960:  IFBB World Most Muscular Man 
1963:  NABBA Pro Mr. Universe (2nd)
1964:  NABBA Pro Mr. Universe (2nd)
1969: NABBA Pro Mr. Universe (3rd)
1969:  IFBB Mr. World (Tall) (2nd)
1970:  IFBB Mr. Europe (Tall) 
1972: IFBB Mr. Olympia (3rd) 
1973: IFBB Mr. Olympia (3rd) 
1975: IFBB Mr. Olympia (Heavy Weight, 2nd) 
1976:  NABBA Pro Mr. Universe 
1976: WBBG Mr. Olympus (2nd) 
1977:  NABBA Pro Mr. Universe (2nd)
1977:  WBBG Mr. Olympus
1977:  WBBG Pro Mr. World
1978:  NABBA Pro. Mr. Universe (2nd) 
1981:  Pro WABBA World Championships 
1983:  Pro WABBA World Championships

Filmography
Source:
My Son, the Hero (1962) (co-starring Giuliano Gemma) - Rator
Goliath and the Rebel Slave (1963) (co-starring Gordon Scott) - Milan
Un gosse de la butte (1964) (co-starring René Lefèvre) - Vincent
13 Days to Die (1965) - Pongo
 (1968, TV miniseries) - Jim
The Seven Red Berets (1969) (co-starring Kirk Morris) - Martinez
The Cop  (1970) - Le Noir
César and Rosalie (1972) (co-starring Yves Montand) - Un acheteur de métaux
Impossible... pas français (1974)
Les demoiselles à péage (1975) - Boulou
Pumping Iron (1977, Documentary, co-starring Arnold Schwarzenegger and Lou Ferrigno)
La part du feu (1978)
Nous maigrirons ensemble (1979) - Le body-builder club de gym
Breakfast Included (1980, TV Mini-Series) - Sissou Lemarchand
The Professional (1981) (co-starring Jean-Paul Belmondo) - L'infirmier au procès
Série Noire (1984, TV Series) - Pierrot
Sins (1986, TV Mini-Series) - Masseur (final appearance)

See also
List of female professional bodybuilders
List of male professional bodybuilders
Pumping Iron

References

External links
History of the Olympia - Serge Nubret
A Tribute to “The Black Panther” Serge Nubret
Sergenubret.com
Muscle Awards host by Serge Nubret

1938 births
2011 deaths
Guadeloupean male bodybuilders
French people of Guadeloupean descent
People associated with physical culture
Professional bodybuilders
French bodybuilders